Stefanie Eva Wyss (born 19 October 1985 in Bern, Switzerland) is a Swiss ice hockey defender.

International career
Wyss was selected for the Switzerland national women's ice hockey team in the 2010 Winter Olympics. She played in all five games, but did not record a point.

Wyss has also appeared for Switzerland at three IIHF Women's World Championships. Her first appearance came in 2007.

Career statistics

International career

References

External links
Eurohockey.com Profile
Sports-Reference Profile

1985 births
Living people
Ice hockey players at the 2010 Winter Olympics
Olympic ice hockey players of Switzerland
Ice hockey people from Bern
Swiss women's ice hockey defencemen